The Scarlet Plague is a post-apocalyptic fiction novel by American writer Jack London, originally published in London Magazine in 1912. The book was noted in 2020 as having been very similar to the  COVID-19 pandemic, especially given London wrote it at a time when the world was not as quickly connected by travel as it is today.

Plot summary
The story takes place in 2073, sixty years after an uncontrollable epidemic, the Red Death, has depopulated the planet. James Smith is one of the survivors of the era before the scarlet plague hit and is still left alive in the San Francisco area, and he travels with his grandsons Edwin, Hoo-Hoo, and Hare-Lip. His grandsons are young and live as primeval  hunter-gatherers in a heavily depopulated world. Their intellect is limited, as are their language abilities. Edwin asks Smith, whom they call "Granser", to tell them of the disease alternately referred to as scarlet plague, scarlet death, or red death.

Smith recounts the story of his life before the plague, when he was an English professor. In 2013, the year after "Morgan the Fifth was appointed President of the United States by the Board of Magnates", the disease came about and spread rapidly. Sufferers would turn scarlet, particularly on the face, and become numb in their lower extremities. Victims usually died within 30 minutes of first seeing symptoms. Despite the public's trust in doctors and scientists, no cure is found, and those who attempted to do so were also killed by the disease. The grandsons question Smith's belief in "germs" causing the illness because they cannot be seen. 

Smith witnesses his first victim of the scarlet plague while teaching when a young woman's face turns scarlet. She dies quickly, and a panic soon overtakes the campus. He returns home, but his family refuses to join him because they fear he is infected. Soon, an epidemic overtakes the area and residents begin rioting and killing one another. Smith meets with colleagues at his college's chemistry building, where they hope to wait out the problem. They soon realize they must move elsewhere for safety and begin trekking northward.

Shortly, Smith's entire party dies out and he is left as the sole survivor. He lives for three years on his own with the company of a pony and two dogs. Eventually, his need for social interaction compels him back to the San Francisco area in search of other people. He finally discovers a sort of new society has been created with a few survivors, who have broken into tribes.

Smith worries that he is the last to remember the times before the plague. He reminisces about the quality of food, social classes, his job, and technology. As he realizes his time grows short, he tries to impart the value of knowledge and wisdom to his grandsons. His efforts are in vain, however, as the children ridicule his recollections of the past, which sound totally unbelievable to them.

Publication history

The Scarlet Plague was written in 1910 but not serialized until the May–June 1912 issue of London Magazine. It was published as a book in 1915 by Macmillan.

London published The Scarlet Plague in book form at a point in his career that biographers and critics have called a "professional decline", from September 1912 to May 1916. In this period, he stopped writing short works and shifted to longer works including The Abysmal Brute (1913), John Barleycorn (1913), The Mutiny of the Elsinore (1914), The Star Rover (1915), among others.

The Scarlet Plague was later reprinted in the February 1949 issue of Famous Fantastic Mysteries. Readers were impressed that London seemed to have anticipated the anxieties of the Atomic Age.

Jack London was inspired in part by Edgar Allan Poe's 1842 short story "The Masque of the Red Death", though the virus itself has different symptoms. Both Poe's story and London's fall into a genre of apocalyptic fiction featuring a universal plague that nearly wipes out humanity. Other examples include Mary Shelley's The Last Man (1826), George R. Stewart's Earth Abides (1949), Michael Crichton's The Andromeda Strain (1969), Stephen King's The Stand (1978)., René Barjavel's Ravage (1943)

See also
 1912 in science fiction

References

External links

 
 
 The Science Fiction Century, David G. Hartwell. Discusses "Last man on Earth" subgenre.

1912 American novels
Novels by Jack London
1912 science fiction novels
American post-apocalyptic novels
Frame stories
Novels first published in serial form
Works originally published in The London Magazine
Fictional diseases and disorders
Fiction set in the 2070s
Macmillan Publishers books
Novels set in San Francisco